Rodney Strickland (born July 11, 1966) is an American basketball coach and former professional basketball player. He is currently the head coach at Long Island University. Prior to LIU, he served as the program manager for the NBA G League's professional path. Strickland played college basketball at DePaul University, where he was awarded All-American honors. He then enjoyed a long career in the National Basketball Association (NBA), playing from 1988 to 2005. Strickland was an assistant coach for the South Florida Bulls, under Orlando Antigua from 2014 to 2017. He formerly served in an administrative role for the University of Kentucky basketball team under head coach John Calipari and was the director of basketball operations at the University of Memphis under Calipari. He is the godfather of current NBA player Kyrie Irving.

High school career

A native of the Bronx, Strickland played for the New York Gauchos. While a junior he led Truman High School in Co-Op City to the state championship and was ranked as one of the top 10 high school recruits in the nation. As a senior, he transferred to Oak Hill Academy in Virginia.

College career
Strickland became a college star at DePaul University where he appeared in 87 games. As a junior, he was a First Team All-American after averaging 20.0 points and 7.8 assists. A 1987 and 1988 All-America pick, Strickland helped lead the Blue Demons to three-straight NCAA Tournament appearances from 1985–86 to 1987–88, including Sweet Sixteen showings in 1986 and 1987. The three-time Blue Demon letterwinner ranks among the program's career leaders in scoring average (8th; 16.6 ppg), assists (3rd; 557) and steals (2nd; 204). He also averaged 3.4 rebounds while shooting 53.4% during his college career.

NBA career

New York Knicks (1988–1990)
He was selected in the first round of the 1988 NBA draft by his hometown New York Knicks where he backed up point guard Mark Jackson, the 1988 NBA Rookie of the Year. He was seen as sort of an odd choice by some observers since the Knicks had Jackson. Nevertheless, Jackson and Strickland shared time that season. Strickland played in all 82 games and averaged 8.9 points and 3.9 assists in 16.8 minutes per game where he was named to the NBA All-Rookie Second Team.

San Antonio Spurs (1990–1992)
Knowing that having both Jackson and Strickland play for the same position would not work, the Knicks dealt Strickland to the San Antonio Spurs for veteran Maurice Cheeks in the middle of the 1989–1990 season. Strickland flourished in San Antonio. The Spurs went 18–6 with him in the starting lineup. He led the Spurs in assists 26 times and averaged 12.3 points and 11.2 assists in 10 playoff games.

In the 1990–91 season Strickland lived up to his expectations as an exciting performer when he was healthy. He missed 24 games that year because of a sore ankle and a broken bone in his right hand. In the 58 games he played, Strickland averaged 13.8 points and 8.0 assists, shooting .482 from the field and .763 from the free throw line. He led the Spurs in assists 46 times and in steals 30 times. Strickland finished the year tied with Terry Porter for 12th in the NBA in assists. In a four-game series loss to the Golden State Warriors in the first round of the 1991 NBA playoffs, he posted 18.8 points, 5.3 rebounds, 8.8 assists, and 2.25 steals in 42.0 minutes per game.

Starting the 1991–92 NBA season in a contract dispute with the Spurs management, Strickland did not play in the first 24 games of the season. He finally signed on December 23, then started 54 of 57 games and averaged 13.8 points, 8.6 assists, 4.6 rebounds, and 2.07 steals in 36.0 minutes per game. He scored in double figures 48 times and scored 20 or more points on eight occasions. He notched a then career-high 28 points against the Indiana Pacers on February 6 and made a career-high 19 assists versus the Minnesota Timberwolves on March 3. Strickland started two playoff games against the Phoenix Suns before missing the third with a broken bone in his left hand. The Suns swept the series in three games.

Portland Trail Blazers (1992–1996)
Before the start of the 1992–93 season, Strickland signed as a free agent with the Portland Trail Blazers.

On April 5, 1994, Strickland set a Trail Blazers record with 20 assists in a single game, during a 135-113 win over the Phoenix Suns.

On January 24, 1995, Strickland set a career high with 36 points scored, on 15-21 shooting from the field, in a 105-99 loss to the Knicks. During that year's playoffs, Strickland averaged 23.3 points and 12.3 assists per game in a first round loss to the Suns.

On April 5, 1996, Strickland scored 27 points and recorded 12 assists in a 110-102 Game 1 loss to the Utah Jazz. The Trail Blazers eventually lost the series 3-2, and the series was contested until Game 5, when Strickland scored only 10 points while missing 11 of his 16 shots, as the Jazz won 102-64.

Despite regular season success in Portland, Strickland and the Trail Blazers never advanced out of the first round in the playoffs during his tenure. In four seasons with the Blazers, Strickland averaged 17 points and 8.6 assists per game.

Washington Bullets/Wizards (1996–2001)
In a move that initially helped both franchises, Strickland and teammate Harvey Grant were traded to the Washington Bullets for Rasheed Wallace and Mitchell Butler in 1996. In his first season in Washington, Strickland averaged 17.2 ppg and 8.9 apg helping the Bullets make the playoffs in 1997 for the first time in 8 seasons.

In 1997–98, Strickland had the best season of his career as he averaged 17.8 ppg and a league leading 10.5 apg. During the year, Strickland also became only the 25th player in NBA history to record 10,000 points and 5,000 assists. Strickland was selected to the Second Team All-NBA. While his individual stats improved over the next few seasons for the Wizards, the team got worse, leading to a buyout of his contract.

Last seasons and retirement (2001–2005)
Strickland returned to the Portland Trail Blazers in 2001. He finished his playing career with the Miami Heat, Minnesota Timberwolves, Orlando Magic, Toronto Raptors, and the Houston Rockets. He played in 1,094 games (740 starts) and scored over 14,000 points and tallied nearly 8,000 assists. He also ranked among the NBA's top 10 in assists per game in 1991–92 (5th), 1993–94 (6th), 1994–95 (5th), 1995–96 (4th), 1996–97 (5th), 1997–98 (1st), and 1998–99 (2nd).

Strickland averaged 13.2 points, 3.7 rebounds, 7.3 assists, 1.5 steals and 30.7 minutes of floor time per game.

NBA career statistics

Regular season

|-
| style="text-align:left;"|
| style="text-align:left;"|New York
| 81 || 10 || 16.8 || .467 || .322 || .745 || 2.0 || 3.9 || 1.2 || .0 || 8.9
|-
| style="text-align:left;"|
| style="text-align:left;"|New York
| 51 || 0 || 20.0 || .440 || .286 || .638 || 2.5 || 4.3 || 1.4 || .2 || 8.4
|-
| style="text-align:left;"|
| style="text-align:left;"|San Antonio
| 31 || 24 || 36.2 || .468 || .222 || .615 || 4.3 || 8.0 || 1.8 || .2 || 14.2
|-
| style="text-align:left;"|
| style="text-align:left;"|San Antonio
| 58 || 56 || 35.8 || .482 || .333 || .763 || 3.8 || 8.0 || 2.0 || .2 || 13.8
|-
| style="text-align:left;"|
| style="text-align:left;"|San Antonio
| 57 || 54 || 36.0 || .455 || .333 || .687 || 4.6 || 8.6 || 2.1 || .3 || 13.8
|-
| style="text-align:left;"|
| style="text-align:left;"|Portland
| 78 || 35 || 31.7 || .485 || .133 || .717 || 4.3 || 7.2 || 1.7 || .3 || 13.7
|-
| style="text-align:left;"|
| style="text-align:left;"|Portland
| 82 || 58 || 35.2 || .483 || .200 || .749 || 4.5 || 9.0 || 1.8 || .3 || 17.2
|-
| style="text-align:left;"|
| style="text-align:left;"|Portland
| 64 || 61 || 35.4 || .466 || .374 || .745 || 5.0 || 8.8 || 1.9 || .1 || 18.9
|-
| style="text-align:left;"|
| style="text-align:left;"|Portland
| 67 || 63 || 37.7 || .460 || .342 || .652 || 4.4 || 9.6 || 1.4 || .2 || 18.7
|-
| style="text-align:left;"|
| style="text-align:left;"|Washington
| 82 || 81 || 36.5 || .466 || .169 || .738 || 4.1 || 8.9 || 1.7 || .2 || 17.2
|-
| style="text-align:left;"|
| style="text-align:left;"|Washington
| 76 || 76 || 39.7 || .434 || .250 || .726 || 5.3 || style="background:#cfecec;"|10.5* || 1.7 || .3 || 17.8
|-
| style="text-align:left;"|
| style="text-align:left;"|Washington
| 44 || 43 || 37.1 || .416 || .286 || .746 || 4.8 || 9.9 || 1.7 || .1 || 15.7
|-
| style="text-align:left;"|
| style="text-align:left;"|Washington
| 69 || 67 || 31.7 || .429 || .048 || .702 || 3.8 || 7.5 || 1.4 || .3 || 12.6
|-
| style="text-align:left;"|
| style="text-align:left;"|Washington
| 33 || 28 || 30.9 || .426 || .250 || .782 || 3.2 || 7.0 || 1.3 || .1 || 12.2
|-
| style="text-align:left;"|
| style="text-align:left;"|Portland
| 21 || 0 || 16.7 || .418 || .000 || .577 || 1.7 || 3.4 || .5 || .0 || 4.6
|-
| style="text-align:left;"|
| style="text-align:left;"|Miami
| 76 || 64 || 30.2 || .443 || .308 || .766 || 3.1 || 6.1 || 1.1 || .1 || 10.4
|-
| style="text-align:left;"|
| style="text-align:left;"|Minnesota
| 47 || 8 || 20.3 || .432 || .091 || .738 || 2.0 || 4.6 || 1.0 || .1 || 6.8
|-
| style="text-align:left;"|
| style="text-align:left;"|Orlando
| 46 || 9 || 19.9 || .454 || .303 || .750 || 2.6 || 4.0 || .6 || .2 || 6.8
|-
| style="text-align:left;"|
| style="text-align:left;"|Toronto
| 15 || 1 || 18.8 || .333 || .000 || .682 || 2.5 || 3.9 || .5 || .3 || 4.7
|-
| style="text-align:left;"|
| style="text-align:left;"|Houston 
| 16 || 2 || 12.3 || .209 || .500 || .900 || 1.7 || 2.4 || .2 || .1 || 1.8
|- class="sortbottom"
| style="text-align:center;" colspan="2"|Career
| 1,094 || 740 || 30.7 || .454 || .282 || .721 || 3.7 || 7.3 || 1.5 || .1 || 13.2

Playoffs

|-
| style="text-align:left;"|1989
| style="text-align:left;"|New York
| 9 || 0 || 12.3 || .449 || 1.000 || .529 || 1.4 || 2.8 || .4 || .1 || 6.0
|-
| style="text-align:left;"|1990
| style="text-align:left;"|San Antonio
| 10 || 10 || 38.4 || .425 || .000 || .556 || 5.3 || 11.2 || 1.4 || .0 || 12.3
|-
| style="text-align:left;"|1991
| style="text-align:left;"|San Antonio
| 4 || 4 || 42.0 || .433 || .000 || .810 || 5.3 || 8.8 || 2.3 || .0 || 18.8
|-
| style="text-align:left;"|1992
| style="text-align:left;"|San Antonio
| 2 || 2 || 40.0 || .591 ||  || .625 || 3.5 || 9.5 || 1.5 || 1.0 || 15.5
|-
| style="text-align:left;"|1993
| style="text-align:left;"|Portland
| 4 || 4 || 39.0 || .423 || .000 || .833 || 6.5 || 9.3 || 1.3 || .5 || 13.5
|-
| style="text-align:left;"|1994
| style="text-align:left;"|Portland
| 4 || 4 || 38.5 || .500 || .000 || .815 || 4.0 || 9.8 || 1.0 || .5 || 23.5
|-
| style="text-align:left;"|1995
| style="text-align:left;"|Portland
| 3 || 3 || 42.0 || .415 || .400 || .778 || 4.0 || 12.3 || 1.0 || .7 || 23.3
|-
| style="text-align:left;"|1996
| style="text-align:left;"|Portland
| 5 || 5 || 40.4 || .440 || .500 || .639 || 6.2 || 8.4 || 1.0 || .0 || 20.6
|-
| style="text-align:left;"|1997
| style="text-align:left;"|Washington
| 3 || 3 || 41.3 || .423 || .500 || .737 || 6.0 || 8.3 || 1.0 || .0 || 19.7
|-
| style="text-align:left;"|2001
| style="text-align:left;"|Portland
| 2 || 0 || 9.5 || .333 ||  || .667 || 2.0 || 1.0 || 1.0 || .0 || 4.0
|-
| style="text-align:left;"|2003
| style="text-align:left;"|Minnesota
| 6 || 0 || 12.2 || .524 ||  || 1.000 || 1.0 || 2.8 || .7 || .3 || 4.7
|- class="sortbottom"
| style="text-align:center;" colspan="2"|Career
| 52 || 35 || 30.7 || .446 || .286 || .706 || 4.0 || 7.5 || 1.1 || .2 || 13.4

Coaching career
Strickland was hired as an assistant coach at USF under former Kentucky assistant coach Orlando Antigua from 2014 to 2017. Prior to that, he served in an administrative role at the University of Kentucky under Coach John Calipari. Strickland started his coaching career as director of basketball operations at the University of Memphis, taking over the job held by former NBA player, Milt Wagner.
In September 2008, Strickland was inducted into the New York City Basketball Hall of Fame along with NBA stars Kenny Anderson and Sam Perkins, coach Pete Gillen and pioneers Lou Bender and Eddie Younger.

Personal life
Strickland is the godfather of the 2011 NBA draft first overall pick and 2012 Rookie of the Year Kyrie Irving. Strickland's son, Tai, currently plays college basketball for Georgia Southern (2022–23) after previously playing for Wisconsin (2018–19) and Temple (2020–21 & 2021–22). His son Terell plays for James Madison (2020–present). Strickland also has a daughter.

See also
 List of National Basketball Association career assists leaders
 List of National Basketball Association career steals leaders
 List of National Basketball Association career turnovers leaders

Notes

External links

1966 births
Living people
African-American basketball players
All-American college men's basketball players
American expatriate basketball people in Canada
American men's basketball players
Basketball coaches from New York (state)
Basketball players from New York City
DePaul Blue Demons men's basketball players
Houston Rockets players
Kentucky Wildcats men's basketball coaches
Miami Heat players
Minnesota Timberwolves players
New York Knicks draft picks
New York Knicks players
Orlando Magic players
Parade High School All-Americans (boys' basketball)
Point guards
Portland Trail Blazers players
San Antonio Spurs players
South Florida Bulls men's basketball coaches
Sportspeople from the Bronx
Toronto Raptors players
Washington Bullets players
Washington Wizards players
21st-century African-American people
20th-century African-American sportspeople